A pullback motor (also pull back or pull-back) is a simple clockwork motor used in toy cars. A patent for them was granted to Bertrand 'Fred' Francis in 1952 as a keyless clockwork motor.

Pulling the car backward (hence the name) winds up an internal spiral spring; a flat spiral rather than a helical coil spring. When released, the car is propelled forward by the spring. When the spring has unwound and the car is moving, the motor is disengaged by a clutch or ratchet and the car then rolls freely onward. Often the clutch mechanism is geared so that the pullback distance needed to wind the spring is less than the distance the spring is engaged propelling forward.

Most of these cars are otherwise free-rolling. Winding them up requires them to be pushed downwards, engaging the clutch. As the motor is only engaged for winding while held down, the complete winding must be completed in one pass, unlike the flywheel motor. Some motors have an internal one-way clutch that allows winding with a back-and-forth motion.

Some pullback motors, usually intended for racing in pairs, have used a catch and release mechanism to retain their springs. These may be wound separately, then launched together by releasing their spring triggers. Darda use such a mechanism for their Stop'n'Go motor. This is pre-wound, then releases automatically when shunted from behind. This allows relay races to be set up with multiple cars.

A few pullback motors are used in toys other than cars. The K'Nex construction toy has such a motor, as have some later Meccano sets.

The very simplest of these motors may use a stretched rubber band as a linear spring, rather than a coil spring. These are bulky and less powerful but require little manufacturing sophistication: coil springs, although apparently simple, demand a highly developed steel metallurgy. For this reason, these toys are usually home- or crafts made.

References 

Toy cars and trucks
Mechanical toys